Joe Chill is a fictional character appearing in American comic books published by DC Comics, commonly in association with the superhero Batman. Created by Bill Finger and Bob Kane, the character first appeared in Detective Comics #33 (November 1939).

In Batman's origin story, Joe Chill is the mugger who murders young Bruce Wayne's parents, Dr. Thomas Wayne and Martha Wayne. The murder traumatizes Bruce, inspiring his vow to avenge their deaths by fighting crime in Gotham City as the vigilante Batman.

Publication history
Joe Chill first appears in Detective Comics #33 and was created by Bill Finger and Bob Kane.

Fictional character biography

Not much is known about Chill except that he is, in most versions of Batman, a petty mugger who kills Bruce's parents Thomas and Martha while trying to take their money and jewelry. When he demands Martha's necklace, Thomas moves to protect his wife and Chill panics and shoots him. He then kills Martha when she screams for help (in later versions up to the 1970s, Martha dies from a heart attack brought on from the shock of seeing her husband murdered). Chill runs away when Bruce begins crying and calling for help — but not before the boy memorizes his features. In at least three versions of the Batman mythos, the Waynes' killer is never identified.

Pre-Crisis version

Batman's origin story is first established in a sequence of panels in Detective Comics #33 (November 1939) that is later reproduced in the comic book Batman #1 (Spring 1940), but the mugger is not given a name until Batman #47 (June–July 1948). In that issue, Batman discovers that Joe Chill, the small-time crime boss he is investigating, is none other than the man who killed his parents. Batman confronts him with the knowledge that Chill killed Thomas and Martha Wayne. Believing there is no way Batman could know this, Chill accuses him of bluffing, but Batman reveals his secret identity quoting "I know because I am the son of the man you murdered! I am Bruce Wayne!!" Terrified, Chill flees and seeks protection from his henchmen. Once his henchmen learn that Chill's actions led to the hated Batman's existence, however, they turn on their boss and gun him down before suddenly realizing how priceless his knowledge of Batman's true identity is. Before the dying Chill has a chance to reveal Batman's identity, the Dark Knight intervenes and knocks out the goons. Chill expires in Batman's arms, acknowledging that the Dark Knight got his revenge after all. Len Wein and John Byrne add a one-panel coda in their retelling of this scene in the first issue of The Untold Legend of the Batman. Batman stands over Chill's body and says "No, Chill -- The Batman didn't finish you... It was Bruce Wayne!"

In Detective Comics #235 (1956), Batman learns that Chill was not a mere mugger, but actually a hitman who murdered the Waynes on orders from a mob boss named Lew Moxon. Batman also deduced that was why he himself was left unharmed by Chill: so he would unwittingly support Moxon's alibi that he had nothing to do with a robbery that was really a planned murder.

In The Brave and the Bold #79 (September 1968), Joe Chill is revealed to have a brother named Max who is also a criminal. Max Chill is suspected of having murdered Boston Brand (AKA Deadman), though the suspicion proves erroneous as Boston Brand was actually killed by Hook. Max is killed when a stack of slot machines falls onto him while he is attacking Batman.

In Batman #208 (January/February 1969), it is revealed that both Joe and Max had changed their name to Chill from Chilton and that their mother was the housekeeper to Bruce Wayne's uncle Philip Wayne, who became Bruce's primary guardian after his parents' deaths. As he was often away on business, Mrs. Chilton played the primary parental role in the boy's life. As an adult, Bruce continues to visit the elderly woman, whom he still calls "Mom Chilton", unaware of her connection with Joe and Max Chill. For her part, Mrs. Chilton knows Bruce is secretly Batman and is proud of him. She is also aware that her sons died fighting him and she still mourns their deaths. Perhaps because they were both domestic servants, Alfred, the adult Bruce's butler, was secretly aware of Mrs. Chilton's connection, but he kept that information from Bruce. He once mused that "in her own way, that dear woman more than made up for her son's heinous crime".

Post-Crisis version
In the 1987 storyline Batman: Year Two, Chill played a key role. Several Gotham City crime bosses pool their resources to deal with a lethal vigilante called the Reaper, and Chill, an experienced button man, is hired to take him out. When Batman proposes an alliance with the bosses, they agree that he and Chill will work together — something Batman finds repugnant, but which he nevertheless justifies to himself as necessary to tackle the Reaper. He vows to kill Chill afterwards. Chill is also secretly commissioned to kill Batman after the Reaper has been disposed of. During a major confrontation, the crime bosses are all killed in a shootout at a warehouse, in which the Reaper seemingly also perishes. Chill reasons that he has no reason to fulfill his contract, but Batman takes him to "Crime Alley", the scene of his parents' murder. There he confronts Chill and reveals his identity. Batman has Chill at gunpoint, but the Reaper then appears and guns Chill down. It is left ambiguous as to whether or not Batman would have actually pulled the trigger.

In the 1991 sequel to "Year Two", Batman: Full Circle, Chill's son Joe Chill, Jr. assumes the identity of the Reaper to seek revenge for his father's death. He attempts to drive Batman insane by using hallucinogenic drugs in conjunction with a faked video of the Waynes' murder to trigger Batman's survivor's guilt over his parents' death and thus break his will. After the intervention of Robin, Batman frees himself from the drug-induced haze. After the new Reaper is defeated, Batman learns to let go of his hatred of Chill.

In Detective Comics #678, a "Zero Hour" crossover story, Batman finds himself in an alternate timeline where, instead of his parents, he was killed by a mugger. Investigating the crime, he discovers that Chill, at least in this timeline, did not commit the murder. Once he returns to his own timeline, Bruce Wayne is plagued with doubt. He wonders if there's a possibility that he never actually caught or confronted his parents' killer. He also wonders if that makes any difference regarding his crimefighting career. Ultimately, he concludes that it does not.

In 2006, Infinite Crisis #6 reestablished that Chill was responsible for shooting Thomas and Martha Wayne, and that he was later arrested on that same night for their murder.

In the 2008 Grant Morrison story "Joe Chill in Hell" (featured in Batman #673), Chill is reinterpreted as a mid-level crime boss who builds the Land, Sea, and Air Transport company from the ground up (most likely through illegal means). He blames his crimes, including murdering the Waynes, on class warfare that forced him to do things he wouldn't have otherwise. In this story, Batman has visited and frightened Chill every night for a month. Chill is living as a shut-in, but his guards never see or catch Batman during the visits. On his final visit, Batman gives Chill the gun he used to kill the Waynes, with a single bullet loaded in it. Chill finally realizes who Batman is and fears what his fellow gangsters might do if they found out he was responsible for creating him. It is implied that he uses his gun to commit suicide. Considering the issue consists of Bruce's flashbacks and hallucinations from an experiment he undergoes during his early career, however, it is left ambiguous whether the events of the story are real.

In 2009's Whatever Happened to the Caped Crusader? by Neil Gaiman, Joe Chill is seen as the bartender attending Batman's funeral (the funeral itself being a near death experience). Batman, who is observing the event as well as Catwoman, note that Joe Chill should be dead. Chill notes that he was there at the birth of Batman and it is only fitting he should be there to witness the end.

The New 52
In 2011, DC Comics relaunched its entire line of monthly books, and rebooted the fictional continuity of its books in an initiative called "The New 52". An 18-year-old Bruce Wayne tracks Chill down and holds him at gunpoint, demanding to know who hired him to kill his parents. Chill responds that he just wanted Martha Wayne's pearls so he could buy alcohol and that he didn't even know who the Waynes were until the next day. Enraged that Chill killed his parents for no good reason, Bruce prepares to kill him, but relents at the last minute when he realizes that his father would not have wanted that. After sparing Chill's life, Bruce Wayne leaves Gotham City and begins training to fight crime, vowing that he will make sure what Chill did never happens to anyone else.

Post-DC Rebirth
In 2016, DC Comics implemented another relaunch of its books called "DC Rebirth", which restored its continuity to a form much as it was prior to "The New 52". In the 2020 miniseries Batman: Three Jokers, a news report about the massacre of the final members of the Moxon Crime Family stated that they were accused of hiring Joe Chill to kill Thomas Wayne and Martha Wayne only for them to be exonerated when Joe Chill confessed that he acted alone. It was also mentioned that Joe Chill is serving a life sentence at Blackgate Penitentiary. Using the fingerprints from Judge Wade Walls' humanitarian trophy, Batman enters Blackgate Penitentiary to see Joe Chill. When Batman finds that he is not in his cell, Batgirl informs Batman that Joe Chill was moved to the infirmary where he is suffering from stage 4 cancer. The Comedian Joker and the Criminal Joker later abduct Joe Chill from the infirmary where they put his hat on him and want him to confess on camera as one of the Jokers asks "Why did you really kill Thomas and Martha Wayne?" Batman, Batgirl, and Jason Todd/Red Hood arrive at the theater where Joe Chill is being held in as a film plays with Joe confessing that he killed the Waynes because he thought they were the kind of rich people who didn't care about the city and it was only after seeing a young Bruce Wayne that he realized his mistake. The Criminal Joker plans to dump Joe Chill in a mixture of the Lazarus Pit and Joker Venom in hopes of making him the ultimate Joker, but Joe Chill is saved by Batman who forgives him. Joe finally learns that Bruce Wayne is Batman. After the death of the Criminal Joker and the surrender of the Comedian Joker who was revealed to be the original Joker, Bruce Wayne visits Joe Chill on his death bed as Bruce shakes his hand. Joe Chill peacefully dies, and Bruce Wayne finally finds closure over his parents' killer.

Other versions

 In Frank Miller's 1986 limited series Batman: The Dark Knight Returns, Bruce Wayne finally resolves his feelings towards Chill (who is not named). While about to be mugged by street punks, Bruce initially fantasizes that the two amateur criminals are both Joe Chill, so he can take out his rage on them. They leave him alone, however, after realizing he would have fought them: "Look at him. He's into it. No fun when they're into it". Bruce realizes that Chill had not killed his parents for killing's sake, as the two punks wanted to do to him, and thus was not truly evil. "All he wanted was money", he thinks to himself. "He was sick and guilty over what he did. I was naïve enough to think him the lowest sort of man".
 In the comics featuring the Crime Syndicate of America, it is revealed that on the Syndicate's alternate Earth, Joe Chill was a friend of Dr. Thomas Wayne. One night, a police officer wants to bring the elder Wayne in for questioning. When he refuses, the police officer suddenly opens fire. This Earth's version of Bruce Wayne and Martha Wayne are killed. Chill comes out of an alleyway to discover the dead bodies and the Waynes' younger son Thomas Wayne Jr., leaves with him, blaming his father for his mother and brother's deaths, and seeing Chill as the only father figure he has left.
 In the alternate universe of the 2011 storyline "Flashpoint", Joe Chill shoots and kills the young Bruce Wayne, and Thomas Wayne seeks to kill him to avenge his son. He locates Chill and attempts to inject him with a drug, but instead beats him to death in a vengeful fury. Afterwards, Thomas puts Chill's gun in a trophy display in the Batcave.
 Joe Chill is featured in many Elseworld titles, including Superman: Speeding Bullets, Citizen Wayne, Batman: In Darkest Knight, Batman: Holy Terror, Batman of Arkham, JLA: Destiny, and Dark Knight Dynasty.
 In Andrew Vachss' novel Batman: The Ultimate Evil, Chill (who is never seen) is revealed to have killed Bruce Wayne's parents on the orders of an international ring of pedophiles. They wanted to silence Bruce's mother Martha, who was investigating their network of sexual slavery and child pornography.
 On the alternate world of Earth 2 as part of The New 52, Joe Chill is a hired assassin who shoots Thomas and Martha Wayne. Thomas survived the shooting and crushes Joe Chill's skull in retaliation for Martha's death.

In other media

Television
 Joe Chill appears in a flashback in The Super Powers Team: Galactic Guardians episode "The Fear", voiced by Michael Rye.
 Joe Chill appears in a fantasy sequence in the Justice League Unlimited episode "For the Man Who Has Everything", voiced by an uncredited Kevin Conroy. After falling victim to a plant called Black Mercy, Batman becomes trapped in a fantasy where Thomas Wayne beats and disarms Chill before he can murder him and Martha until Wonder Woman frees Batman, undoing the fantasy.
 Joe Chill appears in the Batman: The Brave and the Bold episode "Chill of the Night!", voiced by Peter Onorati. This version is a hitman who killed Thomas and Martha Wayne on his boss Lew Moxon's behalf in retaliation for Thomas putting Moxon in jail. In the present, Chill has become an arms dealer selling weapons to supervillains. As part of a bet between the Phantom Stranger and the Spectre over whether Batman will kill him given the knowledge that he killed his parents, Batman attacks Chill, revealing his secret identity to him in the process, but ultimately spares him. The latter tries to ask for help from several supervillains, but they attempt to kill him upon learning he indirectly created Batman, who defeats the villains while the Spectre manipulates the events of the fight to have Chill die by falling debris.
 Joe Chill's role as Thomas and Martha Wayne's killer is taken up by Gothams incarnation of Patrick "Matches" Malone.
 A mental projection of Joe Chill embodying Bruce Wayne's guilt over his parents' deaths appears in the Harley Quinn episode "Batman Begins Forever", voiced by Diedrich Bader.
 Joe Chill will appear in Gotham Knights, portrayed by Doug Bradley.

Film
 In the original script for Batman (1989), crime boss Rupert Thorne hires Joe Chill to murder Thomas Wayne due to the latter running against Thorne for city council. In Sam Hamm's original drafts, Chill is referred to as "Gunman". In the final version of the film however, Jack Napier takes Chill's role as Thomas and Martha's killer while Chill, according to producer Michael Uslan, became one of Napier's minions who accompanied him in mugging the Waynes, was credited as "Other Mugger", and portrayed by Clyde Gatell. This change, due Hamm participating in a screenwriters' strike, was reinserted into the script by Tim Burton and Warren Skaaren.  After Napier fatally shoots Thomas and Martha Wayne, he almost shoots Bruce, but Chill advises him to flee before the police arrive.
 Joe Chill appears in Batman Begins, portrayed by Richard Brake. This version claims to have resorted to mugging the Waynes because he was one of millions of Gothamites struggling with poverty amidst an economic depression. After serving fourteen years in prison, Chill makes a deal to receive parole in return for testifying against his cellmate, mob boss Carmine Falcone. As Chill is escorted out of the courthouse, he is shot and killed by one of Falcone's assassins, depriving Bruce of his own chance for revenge.
 Joe Chill makes a cameo appearance in Batman v Superman: Dawn of Justice, portrayed by an uncredited Damon Caro.
 Joe Chill's role as Thomas and Martha Wayne's killer is taken up by an unnamed Joker fanatic in Joker.
 Joe Chill appears in a flashback in Justice League Dark: Apokolips War.

Video games
 Joe Chill is alluded to in a nightmare sequence in Batman: Arkham Asylum, voiced by an uncredited actor.
 Joe Chill appears in Batman: The Telltale Series, voiced by Jarion Monroe. This version worked as a hitman for Carmine Falcone and murdered Thomas and Martha Wayne on behalf of Falcone's ally Mayor Hamilton Hill. Chill was later imprisoned for his crime and stabbed to death by a fellow inmate hired by Hill to keep him quiet.
 Joe Chill appears in Batman: Arkham VR, voiced by Glenn Wrage.

Miscellaneous
 Joe Chill appears in The Batman Adventures #17. This version became a career criminal after murdering Thomas and Martha Wayne, though he has lived in fear of Bruce Wayne plotting revenge against him ever since, to the point where he sees Bruce's face everywhere he looks. After completing a prison sentence for an unrelated crime, his paranoia worsens when he learns the police detective who originally worked on the Waynes' murder has discovered evidence that he was the killer. Chill attempts to murder the detective, only to be confronted by Batman. In the ensuing fight, Chill unmasks Batman, sees Bruce's face, and jumps off a balcony. Batman tries to save the terrified Chill, but the latter pushes him away and falls to his death.
 Joe Chill's great-grandnephew Jake Chill, who goes on to become the Vigilante, appears in Batman Beyond (vol. 2). Similarly to his great-granduncle, Jake indirectly contributed to Terry McGinnis becoming the new Batman after he killed the latter's father Warren McGinnis.
 Joe Chill appears in Smallville Season 11 as a member of Intergang unconnected to Batman who is later killed by Mr. Freeze.
 An alternate universe incarnation of Joe Chill appears in the Justice League: Gods and Monsters prequel comic as Lew Moxon's right hand who becomes a vampire after being bitten by his universe's Batman, who later kills Chill after he kills Moxon's wife Angela.

See also
 List of Batman family enemies

References

Batman characters
Comics characters introduced in 1939
Fictional assassins in comics
Fictional contract killers
Fictional gangsters
Fictional thieves
DC Comics film characters
DC Comics male supervillains
DC Comics supervillains
Male characters in film
Male film villains
Characters created by Bob Kane
Action film villains